Pointe du Dard is a mountain of Savoie, France. It lies in the Massif de la Vanoise range. It has an elevation of 3,206 metres above sea level.

External links
Weather of Pointe Du Dard

Alpine three-thousanders
Mountains of the Alps
Mountains of Savoie